CCGT may refer to:

 Combined cycle gas turbine, a type of combined cycle power plant commonly used for high efficiency, fast responding electricity generators
 Closed-cycle gas turbine (but combined cycle, see above, is the more common usage for gas turbines)
 Koenigsegg CCGT, race car